Buckhorn is a community in Pulaski County, Missouri, United States. It is on Route 17 just south of its junction with Interstate 44  It is also on historic U.S. Route 66. The community is within the Mark Twain National Forest and the northwest corner of Fort Leonard Wood is three miles to the east. Waynesville is six miles to the northeast along Route 44 and Laquey is two miles to the southwest off of Route 17.

History
The community was so named on account of the image of a buckhorn on a local tavern sign.

The Decker Cave Archeological Site was listed on the National Register of Historic Places in 1971.

References

Unincorporated communities in Pulaski County, Missouri
Unincorporated communities in Missouri